The 2019–20 season was the 27th season for the Ontario Junior Hockey League.

Team Changes
The Buffalo Jr. Sabres didn't not participate due to Covid-19 Pandemic
The Collingwood Colts were renamed the Collingwood Blues
The Whitby Fury moved to Minden, Ontario and were renamed the Haliburton County Huskies
The Brampton Admirals moved to Caledon, Ontario and were renamed the Caledon Admirals

Standings 
Note: GP = Games played; W = Wins; L = Losses; OTL = Overtime losses; SL = Shootout losses; GF = Goals for; GA = Goals against; PTS = Points; x = clinched playoff berth; y = clinched division title; z = clinched conference title

North West Conference

South East Conference

Playoffs

References

External links
https://www.hockeydb.com/ihdb/stats/leagues/seasons/ojhl20092022.html
http://ojhl_site.wttstats.pointstreak.com/standings.html?leagueid=231&seasonid=20521

Ontario Junior Hockey League seasons
OJHL